Scott L. Davis (born January 29, 1970) is a former American football guard. He played college football at Iowa. He was drafted in the 6th round (150th overall) by the New York Giants.

Early years
Davis was born in Glenwood, Iowa and attended Glenwood High School.

Professional career
Davis was selected in the 6th round (150th overall) of the 1993 NFL draft by the New York Giants. He was a member of a draft class that produced Hall of Famer Michael Strahan.

As a rookie, Davis appeared in four games for the Giants. On July 25, 1994, he was involved in a brawl with teammate Chris Maumalanga. The fight resulted in Davis being gashed open from his forehead to his nose. The gash required stitches to be close it. That season, he appeared in 15 games starting four. On July 29, 1995 he signed a two-year contract with the Giants. Going into the 1995 season, he was projected to be the team's starting left guard, however on August 12, he tore the ACL and damaged the MCL in his left knee. It would be a season-ending injury.

On June 17, 1997 he signed with the Atlanta Falcons. After not appearing in a game for two seasons for the Giants, Davis appeared and started in two games for the Falcons.

References

1970 births
Living people
American football offensive guards
Iowa Hawkeyes football players
New York Giants players
Atlanta Falcons players
Players of American football from Iowa
People from Glenwood, Iowa
Ed Block Courage Award recipients